Fountains of Light is the second studio album by American progressive rock band Starcastle. It was their first of two albums to be produced by Roy Thomas Baker, of Queen renown.

Production
While driving to Le Studio on icy mountain roads, the band was following Roy Thomas Baker in their own vehicle and was involved in a car accident that sent bassist Gary Strater to the hospital. Roy Thomas Baker has said making the album was fun, but "a complete disaster" from the very first day.

Track listing

Side 1
 "Fountains" - 10:25
 "Dawning of the Day" - 3:46
 "Silver Winds" - 4:57

Side 2
 "True to the Light" - 6:27
 "Portraits" - 5:03
 "Diamond Song (Deep is the Light)" - 5:36

Credits

Band
 Terry Luttrell - Lead vocals
 Herb Schildt - Synthesizers, organ, piano
 Gary Strater - Bass guitar, Taurus pedals, vocals
 Stephen Hagler - Guitars, vocals
 Matthew Stewart - Guitars, vocals
 Stephen Tassler - Drums, percussion, vocals

Production
 Recorded at: Le Studio, Morin Heights, Quebec, Canada
 Engineered by Nick Blagona
 Re-mixed at Sarm Studios, London, England
 Engineered by Gary Lyons
 Mastered at Sterling Sound, New York, New York
 Engineered by George Marino

References

1977 albums
Starcastle albums
Epic Records albums
Albums produced by Roy Thomas Baker
Albums recorded at Le Studio